Straight Ahead is an album by jazz saxophonist Stanley Turrentine, his first recording for the Blue Note label since Another Story in 1969, featuring four performances by Turrentine with Jimmy Smith, George Benson, Ron Carter and Jimmy Madison, and two tracks with Les McCann, Jimmy Ponder, Peter Brown, and Gerrick King.

Reception
The Allmusic review awarded the album 3 stars and states "Great combination of musicians as on earlier cookers, but time has passed — it does not come off. Pleasant enough though, but lacks high spots".

Track listing
All compositions by Stanley Turrentine except as indicated
 "Plum" (George Benson) - 6:09
 "A Child Is Born" (Thad Jones) - 8:03     
 "Other Side of Time" - 5:25       
 "Straight Ahead" - 6:25
 "The Longer You Wait" (Les McCann, Jon Hendricks) - 8:58   
 "Ah Rio" (Ron Carter) - 4:54
Recorded at Power Play Studios, Long Island City, NY on November 24, 1984 (tracks 5 & 6) and Sigma Sound Studios, NYC on December 7, 1984 (tracks 1-4).

Personnel
Stanley Turrentine - tenor saxophone
Jimmy Smith - organ (tracks 1, 2, 4 & 6)
George Benson - electric guitar (tracks 1, 2, 4 & 6)
Ron Carter - bass (tracks 1, 2, 4 & 6)
Jimmy Madison - drums (tracks 1, 2, 4 & 6) 
Les McCann - piano, electric piano (tracks 3 & 5)
Jimmy Ponder - electric guitar (tracks 3 & 5)
Peter Brown - electric bass (tracks 3 & 5)
Gerrick King drums (tracks 3 & 5)

References

1985 albums
Stanley Turrentine albums
Blue Note Records albums